The Sree Sankara Vidyapeetom (SSV) college is a college in Kerala, India, located at Valayanchirangara, a village on the outskirts of Perumbavoor town.

The college
Sree Sankara Vidyapeetom College, named after the great saint philosopher Sree Sankaracharya, was founded in 1967. The college is managed by the Sree Sankara Trust, which was formed in 1965 for promoting higher education in rural areas in conformity with the ideas propagated by Jagad Guru Adi Sankaracharya.

NAAC
Sree Sankara Vidyapeetom was accredited by the National Assessment and Accreditation Council (NAAC) in 2006.

IQAC
The Inter Quality Assurance Cell (IQAC) was established in the college as a post-accreditation quality system. The prime task of the IQAC is to develop a system for improvement in the performance of the institution.

Grievance Redressal Cell
The student's Grievance Redressal Cell deals with any event felt to be oppressive or dissatisfying.

Anti-ragging cell
The cell protects students as ragging is prohibited as per the decision of the Supreme Court of India in Writ Petition No. (C) 656/1998. AICTE has framed regulation which has been notified vide F.No.37-3/Legal/AICTE/2009 dated 1 July 2009, on curbing the menace of ragging.

UGC cell
A cell collects and distributes information and other guide lines from UGC to the teachers and departments.

Placement cell
The placement cell coordinates the placement activity in the campus for students in the final year of their programme of study. It designs and publishes a placement brochure, initiates dialogues with companies in various cities, and organizes interviews for the students.

NSS
National Service Scheme programme inculcates social welfare in students, and lets them provide a service to society. NSS volunteers help those who are needy to enhance their standard of living and lead a life of dignity. In doing so, volunteers learn from people in villages how to lead a good life despite a scarcity of resources. it also provides help in natural and man-made disasters by providing food, clothing and first aid to the disaster victims.

Undergraduate courses

Bachelor of Arts

English
Economics
Hindi
History

Bachelor of Science

Chemistry
Physics
Mathematics
Computer Science

Bachelor of Commerce

Postgraduate courses
M.A History
M.Sc. Chemistry
M.Sc. Computer science

Self-financing courses
M.Sc. Biochemistry
Master of Commerce

References

External links

Arts and Science colleges in Kerala
Universities and colleges in Ernakulam district
Colleges affiliated to Mahatma Gandhi University, Kerala
Educational institutions established in 1967
1967 establishments in Kerala